Paris-East Créteil  University (French: Université Paris-Est Créteil, commonly known as Paris XII or UPEC) is a public university located in Créteil, Île-de-France, France. It  was inaugurated in 1970. The university offers training in law, arts and humanities, science and technology, economics and development, administration and exchange, educational science, as well as social sciences.

The university is composed of seventeen institutes situated in Créteil (Val-de-Marne), Seine-Saint-Denis, Seine-et-Marne, and in the 14th arrondissement of Paris.

History
Following the division of the second oldest academic institution, the University of Paris, into thirteen autonomous universities, Val de Marne University was created on March 21, 1970.

The CHU Henri-Mondor facility for the medical school was the first to be built in 1969, shortly before the law and business schools hosted in La Varenne-Saint-Hilaire. In 1970 the university expanded through the construction of the Créteil centre. Further major expansions occurred in 1988, when the Technological centre was created in Sénart and Fontainebleau, and 2005, when the law school was relocated from Saint-Maur to Créteil.
The last institute of International politics studies was created in 2021 in Fontainebleau.

Academics

UFR (Units of formation and research)

Institutes

Institute of International Administration and Exchange (AEI School)
Institute of Health and Digital Engineers (EPISEN)
Institute of Healthcare Training and Research (ESM)
Institute of Urbanism (Ecole d'urbanisme de Paris)
Institute of Technology in Créteil-Vitry (IUT of Créteil-Vitry)
Institute of Technology in Sénart-Fontainebleau (IUT Sénart-Fontainebleau)
Institute of International politics studies
Eiffel School of Management (IAE Paris-Est)
Institute of Ergotherapy 
Institute of Humanities
Institute of Universe sciences (OSU-EFLUVE)
Institute of Medical
Institute of Educational Studies (INSPE Créteil)
Institute of Economic Science and Business Administration
Institute of Sciences and Technology 
Institute of Educational and Physical sciences (ESS-STAPS)

See also
 List of public universities in France by academy

References

External links

Official website (french)

Educational institutions established in 1970
1970 establishments in France
Créteil
Buildings and structures in Val-de-Marne
Universities in Île-de-France